Greenwood Memorial Park may refer to:

Greenwood Memorial Park (Fort Worth)
Greenwood Memorial Park (Phoenix)
Greenwood Memorial Park (Renton, Washington)
Greenwood Memorial Park (San Diego)